Hit Me Like a Man EP is the second extended play (EP) by American rock band The Pretty Reckless. It was released on March 2, 2012, by Interscope Records. The EP contains three new songs, as well as live renditions of "Make Me Wanna Die" and "Since You're Gone"—originally included on the band's debut studio album, Light Me Up (2010)—which were recorded at London's Hammersmith Apollo on November 4 and 5, 2011.

In support of the EP, The Pretty Reckless embarked on a North American tour called The Medicine Tour in March and April 2012, followed by dates on Marilyn Manson's Hey Cruel World... Tour in April and May 2012.

Critical reception

Robert Copsey of Digital Spy praised the EP as "a collection of wonderfully salacious and unashamedly bare-faced songs that today's charts are sorely lacking."

Stephen Thomas Erlewine of AllMusic viewed the three new songs on the EP as "harder and better than much of [the band's] guilty-pleasure debut, Light Me Up", concluding, "Sure, former child actress [Taylor] Momsen may just be acting out her teenage rebellion on a large stage and her imagination may be limited, but she is not insincere and the heartfelt tawdriness of Hit Me Like a Man is oddly compelling."

Track listing

Personnel
Credits adapted from the liner notes of Hit Me Like a Man EP.

The Pretty Reckless
 Taylor Momsen – vocals
 Ben Phillips – guitar , backing vocals , shared lead vocals 
 Mark Damon – bass
 Jamie Perkins – drums

Additional personnel
 Kato Khandwala – production, engineering, mixing , programming , guitar, strings, keyboards , recording 
 Brian Robbins – engineering assistance 
 Jon Cohan – drum tech 
 Jeff Kazee – organ

Charts

Release history

References

2012 EPs
Interscope Records EPs
The Pretty Reckless albums